Alfred Gustave Ward (November 29, 1908 – April 3, 1982) was an admiral in the United States Navy. From 1965 to 1968, Ward was assigned as U.S. Military Representative, NATO Military Committee. During the Cuban Missile Crisis of 1962, Ward, then commander of the Second Fleet and Strike Fleet, Atlantic, was also responsible for supervising the blockade of Cuba. He died in 1982 at the Perry Point Veterans Administration Medical Center.

References 

1908 births
1982 deaths
Military personnel from Mobile, Alabama
United States Navy admirals